Aporosa is a genus of flowering plant belonging to the  family Phyllanthaceae, first described as a genus in 1825. It is native to China, the Indian Subcontinent, Southeast Asia, Papuasia, and Queensland.

These plants are mostly dioecious trees or shrubs. Four species (A. hermaphrodita, A. heterodoxa, A. brevicaudata, and A. egreria) have consistently bisexual flowers, although they may be functionally dioecious. The seeds have brightly colored arils that are attractive to birds, which disperse the seeds.

There are about 80 species.

Species

formerly included
moved to other genera: Antidesma Baccaurea Drypetes Shirakiopsis

References

 
Phyllanthaceae genera
Dioecious plants